SOS Homophobie is an LGBT support organization based in France that deals with homophobia. The organization currently consists of a 900 volunteer members as well as 17 regional offices, all of which are based in France. The group is frequently mentioned on various media such as social media sites, television, and print. SOS Homophobie provides national support programs including an anonymous hotline, testimonials on websites and support offered through postal mail. The main objectives of the organization are to support those who have fallen victim to homophobia and to run homophobia prevention events. Moreover, the organization aims to ultimately achieve equality between homosexual and heterosexual couples, and equal treatment for people despite sexual orientation.

History
SOS Homophobie was initially established on 11 April 1994 as a solely volunteer-only based initiative. The goal was to develop a helpline for LGBT individuals of France. In 1997 yearly reports were written and continue to be made each year. A webpage has been made in order for youth to clarify their understanding of LGBT.

Fields of activity
Between 2010 and 2011, SOS Homophobie took part in various events aiming to protect and raise public awareness  of the rights of LGBT people. The following are examples of such:
 The Trail of Sexualities in Lyon
 The International Day against Homophobia
 The Gay Pride LGBT and Gay Prides in Paris and the region
 The Day of the Fight against AIDS
 LGBT Associations Printemps in Paris or the first LGBT Salon de Lille.

SOS Homophobie continues to be actively involved regarding issues related to the LGBT community. In 2012, counsel, Caroline Mecary, represented the association and responded to France’s Constitutional Council deferral decision on gay marriage. She claims that "it is probably necessary to wait for an alternative policy in 2012, so that the parties of the Left, which are favorable to the opening of marriage and adoption for same-sex couples, initiate a reform."

Cooperation
From 2006 and beyond, SOS Homophobie has met with representatives of several influential LGBT organizations – MANEO (Germany), Lambda Warsaw (Poland), and KPH Kampania Przewic Homofobie (Poland). The groups have held conferences in which they discussed relevant issues. Together they have joined to achieve a common purpose - to fight against homophobia and support the creation of a world with increased equality. They signed a joint declaration, the “Tolerancja Declaration”, to achieve these goals. The objectives of the “Tolerancja Declaration” are as such:
Regular expert meetings to exchange ideas and suggestions for project implementation
Improvements in the recording of and assessment of homophobia related violence in respective countries
Promotion of the “International Day Against Homophobia” (May 17)  with actions and events
A joint European prize, the “Tolerantia Prize”, to be given to individual(s) for their efforts in protecting the rights and freedoms of homosexuals’
In 2008, four groups agreed to cooperate with the Spanish gay-Lesbian organizations TRIANGULO and COGAM in the “Berliner Bündnis gegen Homophobie und Hassgewalt(Berlin Alliance Against Homophobia and Hate Violence)” in order to increase networks and strengthen their initiatives.

Areas of work
Online Testimonies
Collect and gather information through listening to different communication channels like the anonymous hotline services, to create online testimonies.
Annual Reports
Published annual reports to tackle the issues that arise from homophobia in France.
School Intervention
Provide sufficient training for volunteers prior to setting up debates with students to solve their confusion with regards to homophobia. The aim to promote the idea of gay, lesbian, bisexual and transgender to prevent students from participating in gender discriminatory acts, bullying and violent acts.
Internet Regulation
To stop the rapid spread of LGBT discrimination prominent on certain webpages. It focuses mainly on Twitter with hashtags like “#TeamHomophobe” and “#UnGayMort”.

See also

LGBT rights in France
List of LGBT rights organizations

References

External links
Official website
http://www.cestcommeca.net/
http://www.homophobiaday.org/
http://www.kph.org.pl/

LGBT political advocacy groups in France
Organizations established in 1994
Anti-homophobia
Non-profit organizations based in France